St. Luke's Episcopal Church is a historic Carpenter Gothic church, built during the 1850s at Cahaba, the first capital of Alabama from 1820 to 1826.  The unknown builder closely followed plans published by architect Richard Upjohn in his 1852 book Rural Architecture.

Exterior features of the Gothic Revival structure include lancet windows, pointed arch doorways and vertical board and batten sheathing.  The building originally had a square bell tower on the corner to the left of the current main front entrance, but this was not rebuilt when the church was relocated in 1878 to Martin's Station. The church was disassembled and relocated to Cahaba in 2007, where it was reassembled at Old Cahawba Archaeological Park.

History
St. Luke's was built in 1854, during Cahaba's antebellum boom years, on Vine Street near the intersection of Vine and 1st South Street.  Following the post-war decline of Cahaba, the church was dismantled in 1878 and moved  to the village of Martin's Station, where it was reassembled and continued to serve an Episcopal congregation for several decades. It was later used by an African-American Baptist congregation for over 60 years before being acquired by the Alabama Historical Commission. It was added to the National Register of Historic Places on March 25, 1982.

During the academic year 2006–2007, students from Auburn University's Rural Project carefully dismantled the church building so that it could be moved back to Cahaba and reassembled at Old Cahawba Archaeological Park.  From 2007 to 2008 the students reassembled the building at Cahaba, near the corner of Beech Street and Capitol Street, across from the Old Cahawba Archaeological Park visitor center.  This third new site was chosen due to the original location on Vine Street being located in a floodplain. Most of the exterior work had been completed by late 2009.

See also

National Register of Historic Places listings in Dallas County, Alabama
Structure relocation

References

External links
Old Cahawba: "Alabama's most famous Ghost Town"

National Register of Historic Places in Dallas County, Alabama
Churches on the National Register of Historic Places in Alabama
Episcopal church buildings in Alabama
Carpenter Gothic church buildings in Alabama
Churches completed in 1854
19th-century Episcopal church buildings
Relocated buildings and structures in Alabama
Historic American Buildings Survey in Alabama